Fire and brimstone ( gofrit va’esh) is an idiomatic expression referring to God's wrath found in both the Hebrew Bible and the Christian New Testament. In the Bible, it often appears in reference to the fate of the unfaithful. Brimstone, an archaic term synonymous with sulfur, evokes the acrid odor of sulfur dioxide given off by lightning strikes. Lightning was understood as divine punishment by many ancient religions; the association of sulfur with divine retribution is common in the Bible. 

The idiomatic English translation of "fire and brimstone" is found in the Christian King James Version translation of the Hebrew Bible and was also later used in the 1917 translation of the Jewish Publication Society. The 1857 Leeser translation of the Tanakh inconsistently uses both "sulfur" and "brimstone" to translate גׇּפְרִ֣ית וָאֵ֑שׁ. The translation used by the 1985 New JPS is "sulfurous fire" while the 1978 Christian New International Version translation uses "burning sulfur." 

Used as an adjective, fire-and-brimstone often refers to a style of Christian preaching that uses vivid descriptions of judgment and eternal damnation to encourage repentance especially popular during historical periods of Great Awakening.

References in the Hebrew Bible
The Hebrew Bible both uses the phrase "fire and brimstone" in the context of divine punishment and purification. In Genesis 19, God destroys Sodom and Gomorrah with a rain of fire and brimstone, and in Deuteronomy 29, the Israelites are warned that the same punishment would fall upon them should they abandon their covenant with God. Elsewhere, divine judgments involving fire and sulfur are prophesied against Assyria (Isaiah 30), Edom (Isaiah 34), Gog (Ezekiel 38), and all the wicked (Psalm 11). 

The breath of God, in Isaiah 30:33, is compared to brimstone: "The breath of Yahweh, like a stream of brimstone, doth kindle it."

In Christianity

Fire and brimstone frequently appear as agents of divine wrath throughout the Christian Book of Revelation culminating in chapters 19–21, wherein Satan and the ungodly are cast into a lake of fire burning with brimstone (limnēn tou pyros tēs kaiomenēs en thei). The fire appears in such passages as "eternal," not the body or souls of persons.

Islamic reference
The story of prophet Lot finds mention in several Qur'anic passages, especially Chapter 26 (Ash-Shu'ara):160-175 which reads: "The people of Lut rejected the apostles. Behold, their brother Lut said to them: "Will ye not fear (God)? "I am to you an apostle worthy of all trust. "So fear God and obey me. "No reward do I ask of you for it: my reward is only from the lord of the Worlds. "Of all the creatures in the world, will ye approach males, "And leave those whom God has created for you to be your mates? Nay, ye are a people transgressing (all limits)!" They said: "If thou desist not, O Lut! thou wilt assuredly be cast out!" He said: "I do detest your doings." "O my Lord! deliver me and my family from such things as they do!" So We delivered him and his family,- all Except an old woman who lingered behind. But the rest We destroyed utterly. We rained down on them a shower (of brimstone): and evil was the shower on those who were admonished (but heeded not)! Verily in this is a Sign: but most of them do not believe. And verily thy Lord is He, the Exalted in Might Most Merciful."

History
According to Josephus, "Now this country is then so sadly burnt up, that nobody cares to come at it;... It was of old a most happy land, both for the fruits it bore and the riches of its cities, although it be now all burnt up. It is related how for the impiety of its inhabitants, it was burnt by lightning; in consequence of which there are still the remainders of that divine fire; and the traces (or shadows) of the five cities are still to be seen,..." (The Jewish War, book IV, end of ch. 8, in reference to Sodom.)

Puritan preacher Thomas Vincent (an eyewitness of the Great Fire of London) authored a book called "Fire and Brimstone in Hell", first published in 1670. In it he quotes from Psalm 11:6 "Upon the wicked he shall rain snares, fire and brimstone, and a horrible tempest, this shall be the portion of their cup."

Preachers such as Jonathan Edwards and George Whitefield were referred to as "fire-and-brimstone preachers" during the First Great Awakening of the 1730s and 1740s. Edwards' "Sinners in the Hands of an Angry God" remains among the best-known sermons from this period. Reports of one occasion when Edwards preached it said that many of the audience burst out weeping, and others cried out in anguish or even fainted.

See also 
 Hellfire preaching
 Afterlife
 Fear of God
 
 Hell
 
 Sinners in the Hands of an Angry God

References

External links
The Straight Dope on Fire and Brimstone

Christian eschatology
Homiletics
Fire in religion
Sodom and Gomorrah
Sulfur
Hell (Christianity)